Wilton Park may refer to:

Places

In Australia 
Wilton Park, Wilton (New South Wales), a heritage-listed farm in Wilton, in south-western Sydney, New South Wales

In the United Kingdom 
Wilton Park Estate, an estate in Buckinghamshire
Wilton Park, Beaconsfield, a cricket ground within the estate
Wilton Park, Batley, a public park in West Yorkshire
Bagshaw Museum, formerly called Wilton Park Museum, within the park
Wilton Park, the grounds of Wilton House, Wiltshire

Organisations
 Wilton Park, an executive agency of the UK Foreign and Commonwealth Office

See also
Wilton Parish